Baş Zəyzid (also, Baş Zəyzit and Bash-Zeyzit) is a village and municipality in the Shaki Rayon of Azerbaijan.  It has a population of 4,433.

References 

Populated places in Shaki District